Sten Hallström, also known by his stage name StoneBridge, is a Swedish DJ and record producer. He received international acclaim with the remix of the 1993 hit "Show Me Love" with Robin S. and his remix for "Closer" by Ne-Yo which received a 2008 Grammy nomination.

StoneBridge is also a resident at Sirius XM/BPM with his show StoneBridge #bpmMix every Saturday 11pm (PST) over North America. He also mixes his weekly StoneBridge HKJ podcast and runs his two record labels Stoney Boy Music and Dirty Harry Records.

Biography
StoneBridge started releasing remix records in the 80's with the label Remixed Records, he had also been running the Swedish DJ/remix outfit SweMix, formed at the end of the 1980s.

He has released several 12" remixes, CDs, and has several singles, including "Put 'Em High", "Take Me Away" and "Freak On" from the debut album 'Can't Get Enough' 2005. Some of his singles featured the Swedish vocalist Therese. In 2006, he released a DJ mix album, The Flavour The Vibe, as well as started working on his follow-up album Music Takes Me, which was released in 2007. A follow-up to The Flavour The Vibe Vol 2 was released in 2008, as well as a Best of Stoney Boy Music two one mixes for iTunes. A third artist album, 'The Morning After' was released 2010. In recent years StoneBridge has released several successful singles such as 'Be Kind' (with Crystal Waters 2014), 'You Can Have It All' (featuring Koko LaRoo 2015), 'Believe It' (featuring Koko LaRoo 2015), Turn It Down For What (featuring Seri 2017), #1 Billboard Club Chart singles 'If You Like It (featuring Elsa Li Jones 2016)', Put 'Em High 2016 (featuring Therese), Meet In The Middle (featuring Haley Joelle 2018).

In 2008, StoneBridge remixed Ne-Yo's track "Closer", and the comeback single from New Kids on the Block, featuring Ne-Yo, entitled "Single". StoneBridge garnered a Grammy Award nomination for his remix of "Closer". In 2012 StoneBridge received a BMI Songwriter of the year award for his contribution to Jason Derulo 'Don't Wanna Go Home'.

In the following decades contemporary remixes have included Ariana Grande 'No Tears Left to Cry', Enrique Iglesias featuring Pitbull 'Move to Miami', Pink 'Beautiful Trauma', Diana Ross classics 'Upside Down/I'm Coming Out' and 'Ain't No Mountain High Enough'. Classic remixes include "Me and My Imagination" by Sophie Ellis-Bextor, "Talkin' 2 Myself" by Ayumi Hamasaki, and "Gimme More" by Britney Spears. 

In 2022 See's the Re-Release of  StoneBridge - You Don't Know (2022 Remixes) Featuring Kenny Thomas, Dayeene, On  'Stoney Boy Music'  With Brand New Remixes from Himself and UK's PhunkAgenda (Cleveland City Records) Including the Original mix Remastered, Released 12 Aug On All Major Platforms, Supported by Hedkandi, RTE, Gaydio, Radio Metro, Hot Hits UK, Classic Central Radio and many more..

Discography

Albums
 StoneBridge - All Nite Long (Mix album) (1998)
 StoneBridge - Fast Funky & Furious (Mix album) (2000)
 Can't Get Enough (Artist album) (2004)
 The Flavour, The Vibe (Mix album) (2006)
 Music Takes Me (Artist album) (2007)
 The Best of Stoney Boy Music (Mix album) (2008)
 The Flavour, The Vibe Vol 2 (Mix album) (2008)
 The Flavour, The Vibe Vol 3 (Mix album) (2009)
 The Morning After (Artist album) (2010)

Singles

† StoneBridge featuring Therese
‡ StoneBridge vs Ultra Naté

Selected remixes
Alexandra Burke — "Start Without You"
AP3 (featuring Flo Rida) — "Have It All"
Ariana Grande — "no tears left to cry"
Axwell — "Jazzplayer"
Ayumi Hamasaki — "Talkin' 2 Myself"
Britney Spears — "Gimme More"
Cher — "You Haven't See the Last of Me"
Dario G — "Say What's On Your Mind"
Diana Ross — "Ain't No Mountain High Enough"
Deborah Harry — "Two Times Blue"
Enrique Iglesias — "Escape"
Eurythmics — "Here Comes the Rain Again"
Jennifer Hudson — "If This Isn't Love"
Justice — "New Lands"
Jessica Jarrell — "Armageddon"
La Bouche — "Sweet Dreams"
Lily Allen — "The Fear"
Locnville — "Sun In My Pockets"
Lucie Vondrackova — "Ty jsi ten nej"
Lulu — "Goodbye Baby and Amen"
Melanie C — "I Turn to You"
Metro (featuring Nelly Furtado) — "Sticks & Stones"
Missy Elliott (featuring Ciara & Fatman Scoop) — "Lose Control"
Natasha Bedingfield — "Pocketful of Sunshine"
Ne-Yo — "Closer"
*NSYNC — "Here We Go"/"Tearin' Up My Heart"
Paradiso Girls (featuring Lil' Jon & Eve) — "Patron Tequila"
Paul Morrell (featuring Katherine Ellis) — "Keep On Loving Me"
Paul Smith — "Hey Pluto! (Inspire By Original Mickey Mouse Cartoons)"
Robin S — "Show Me Love"
Roxette — "The Centre of the Heart"
Shaggy — "Boombastic"
Sia — "The Girl You Lost to Cocaine"
Sophie Ellis-Bextor — "Me and My Imagination"
Usher (featuring Young Jeezy) — "Love in This Club"
Dannii Minogue — "Touch Me Like That"
The Pussycat Dolls — "Whatcha Think About That"
Sybil — "Stronger"
Taio Cruz — "Dynamite"
WTS (featuring Gia) — "One Night"
Yoko Ono — "Give Me Something"
2Pac (featuring The Notorious B.I.G., Dramacydal, and Stretch) - "Runnin' from tha Police"

References

External links
Official StoneBridge homepage

The History of SweMix with Interview by StoneBridge

Swedish electronic musicians
Living people
Year of birth missing (living people)
Swedish DJs
Swedish record producers
Swedish house musicians
Electronic dance music DJs